Pechki is a rural locality (a selo) in Soskovsky District of Oryol Oblast, Russia.

References

Rural localities in Oryol Oblast